Justice Longs Christopher (24 December 1981 – 9 March 2022) was a Nigerian professional footballer who played as a midfielder.

Club career
Christopher played for several clubs, including Katsina United, Sharks F.C., Bendel Insurance, Antwerp (Belgium), Levski Sofia (Bulgaria), Trelleborgs FF (Sweden), Alania Vladikavkaz in Russia and Herfølge Boldklub in Denmark.

After the end of the season 2006–07 season he announced his retirement from football.

On 21 October 2012, Christopher announced his comeback and signed for Nasarawa United.

International career
Christopher made a total of 11 appearances for the Nigeria national team and was a participant at the 2002 FIFA World Cup, playing in all three games before the team's group stage elimination.

Personal life
Christopher died on 9 March 2022, at the age of 40, having collapsed at a hotel he owned in Jos, Nigeria.

Career statistics

Club

International

References

1981 births
2022 deaths
Sportspeople from Jos
Nigerian footballers
Association football midfielders
Nigeria international footballers
2002 FIFA World Cup players
2002 African Cup of Nations players
Belgian Pro League players
Danish Superliga players
First Professional Football League (Bulgaria) players
Russian Premier League players
Allsvenskan players
Katsina United F.C. players
Sharks F.C. players
Bendel Insurance F.C. players
Royal Antwerp F.C. players
PFC Levski Sofia players
Trelleborgs FF players
FC Spartak Vladikavkaz players
Herfølge Boldklub players
Nasarawa United F.C. players
Nigerian expatriate footballers
Nigerian expatriate sportspeople in Belgium
Expatriate footballers in Belgium
Nigerian expatriate sportspeople in Bulgaria
Expatriate footballers in Bulgaria
Nigerian expatriate sportspeople in Sweden
Expatriate footballers in Sweden
Nigerian expatriate sportspeople in Russia
Expatriate footballers in Russia
Nigerian expatriate sportspeople in Denmark
Expatriate men's footballers in Denmark